

QP51A Agents against protozoal diseases

QP51AA Nitroimidazole derivatives
QP51AA01 Metronidazole
QP51AA02 Tinidazole
QP51AA03 Ornidazole
QP51AA04 Azanidazole
QP51AA05 Propenidazole
QP51AA06 Nimorazole
QP51AA07 Dimetridazole
QP51AA08 Ronidazole
QP51AA09 Carnidazole
QP51AA10 Ipronidazole

QP51AB Antimony compounds
QP51AB01 Meglumine antimonate
QP51AB02 Sodium stibogluconate

QP51AC Nitrofuran derivatives
QP51AC01 Nifurtimox
QP51AC02 Nitrofural

QP51AD Arsenic compounds
QP51AD01 Arsthinol
QP51AD02 Difetarsone
QP51AD03 Glycobiarsol
QP51AD04 Melarsoprol
QP51AD05 Acetarsol
QP51AD06 Melarsamin
QP51AD53 Glycobiarsol, combinations

QP51AE Carbanilides
QP51AE01 Imidocarb
QP51AE02 Suramin sodium
QP51AE03 Nicarbazine

QP51AF Aromatic diamidines
QP51AF01 Diminazen
QP51AF02 Pentamidine
QP51AF03 Phenamidine

QP51AG Sulfonamides, plain and in combinations
QP51AG01 Sulfadimidine
QP51AG02 Sulfadimethoxine
QP51AG03 Sulfaquinoxaline
QP51AG04 Sulfaclozine
QP51AG30 Combinations of sulfonamides
QP51AG51 Sulfadimidine, combinations
QP51AG53 Sulfaquinoxaline, combinations

QP51AH Pyranes and hydropyranes
QP51AH01 Salinomycin
QP51AH02 Lasalocid
QP51AH03 Monensin
QP51AH04 Narasin
QP51AH54 Narasin, combinations

QP51AJ Triazines
QP51AJ01 Toltrazuril
QP51AJ02 Clazuril
QP51AJ03 Diclazuril
QP51AJ04 Ponazuril
QP51AJ51 Toltrazuril, combinations

QP51AX Other antiprotozoal agents
QP51AX01 Chiniofon
QP51AX02 Emetine
QP51AX03 Phanquinone
QP51AX04 Mepacrine
QP51AX05 Nifursol
QP51AX06 Homidium
QP51AX07 Diminazen
QP51AX08 Halofuginone
QP51AX09 Amprolium
QP51AX10 Maduramicin
QP51AX11 Arprinocid
QP51AX12 Dinitolmide
QP51AX13 Robenidine
QP51AX14 Decoquinate
QP51AX16 Aminonitrothiazol
QP51AX17 Ethopabate
QP51AX18 Diaveridine
QP51AX19 Isometamidium
QP51AX20 Quinapyramine
QP51AX21 Parvaquone
QP51AX22 Buparvaquone
QP51AX23 Fumagillin
QP51AX24 Domperidone
QP51AX25 Miltefosine
QP51AX26 Clopidol
QP51AX30 Combinations of other protozoal agents
QP51AX51 Pyrimethamine, combinations
QP51AX59 Amprolium, combinations

QP51B Agents against coccidiosis – optional classification

Empty group

QP51C Agents against amoebiosis and histomonosis – optional classification

Empty group

QP51D Agents against leishmaniosis and trypanosomosis – optional classification

Empty group

QP51E Agents against babesiosis and theileriosis – optional classification

Empty group

QP51X Other antiprotozoal agents – optional classification

Empty group

References

P51